This list of mammals of Oklahoma lists all wild mammal species recorded in the state of Oklahoma. This includes mammals that are extirpated from the state and species introduced into the state. It does not include species that are domesticated.

Didelphimorphia

Opossums
Order: DidelphimorphiaFamily: Didelphidae
 Virginia opossum, Didelphis virginiana

Eulipotyphla

Shrews
Order: EulipotyphlaFamily: Soricidae

Southern short-tailed shrew, Blarina carolinensis
Elliot's short-tailed shrew, Blarina hylophaga
Least shrew, Cryptotis parva
Desert shrew, Notiosorex crawfordi
Southeastern shrew, Sorex longirostris

Moles
Order: EulipotyphlaFamily: Talpidae

Eastern mole, Scalopus aquaticus

Cingulata

Armadillos
Order: CingulataFamily: Dasypodidae

Nine-banded armadillo, Dasypus novemcinctus

Rodentia

Beavers
Order: RodentiaFamily: Castoridae

North American beaver, Castor canadensis

Pocket gophers
Order: RodentiaFamily: Geomyidae

Yellow-faced pocket gopher, Cratogeomys castanops
Plains pocket gopher, Geomys bursarius

Kangaroo rats and pocket mice
Order: RodentiaFamily: Heteromyidae

Texas kangaroo rat, Dipodomys elator
Ord's kangaroo rat, Dipodomys ordii
Hispid pocket mouse, Perognathus fasciatus
Plains pocket mouse, Perognathus flavescens
Silky pocket mouse, Perognathus flavus

Porcupines
Order: RodentiaFamily: Erethizontidae

North American porcupine, Erethizon dorsatum

Jumping mice
Order: RodentiaFamily: Dipodidae

Meadow jumping mouse, Zapus hudsonius

New World rats, mice, and voles
Order: RodentiaFamily: Cricetidae
Eastern harvest mouse, Reithrodontomys humulis
Muskrat, Ondatra zibethicus
Texas mouse, Peromyscus attwateri
Fulvous harvest mouse, Reithrodontomys fulvescens
Marsh rice rat, Oryzomys palustris
Eastern woodrat, Neotoma floridana
Mexican woodrat, Neotoma mexicana
White-throated woodrat, Neotoma albigula
Southern plains woodrat, Neotoma micropus
Brush mouse, Peromyscus boylii
Rock mouse, Peromyscus difficilis
Cotton mouse, Peromyscus gossypinus
White-footed mouse, Peromyscus leucopus
Western deer mouse, Peromyscus sonoriensis
Pinyon mouse, Peromyscus truei
Western harvest mouse, Reithrodontomys megalotis
White-ankled mouse, Peromyscus pectoralis
Plains harvest mouse, Reithrodontomys montanus
Northern grasshopper mouse, Onychomys leucogaster
Northern pygmy mouse, Baiomys taylori
Hispid cotton rat, Sigmodon hispidus
Sagebrush vole, Lemmiscus curtatus
Long-tailed vole, Microtus longicaudus
Prairie vole, Microtus ochrogaster
Woodland vole, Microtus pinetorum

Old World rats and mice
Order: RodentiaFamily: Muridae
Brown rat, Rattus norvegicus introduced
House mouse, Mus musculus introduced
Black rat, Rattus rattus introduced

Chipmunks, marmots, and squirrels
Order: RodentiaFamily: Sciuridae

Eastern gray squirrel, Sciurus carolinensis
Fox squirrel, Sciurus niger
Black-tailed prairie dog, Cynomys ludovicianus
Southern flying squirrel, Glaucomys volans
Groundhog, Marmota monax
Spotted ground squirrel, Xeropermophilus spilosoma
Thirteen-lined ground squirrel, Ictodomys tridecemlineatus
Rock squirrel, Otospermophilus variegatus
Eastern chipmunk, Tamias striatus
Colorado chipmunk, Neotamias quadrivittatus

Myocastorids
Order: RodentiaFamily: Myocastoridae 
Nutria, Myocastor coypus introduced

Lagomorpha

Rabbits and hares
Order: LagomorphaFamily: Leporidae

Black-tailed jackrabbit, Lepus californicus
Swamp rabbit, Sylvilagus aquaticus
Desert cottontail, Sylvilagus audubonii
Eastern cottontail, Sylvilagus floridanus

Chiroptera

Vesper bats
Order: ChiropteraFamily: Vespertilionidae

Pallid bat, Antrozous pallidus
Rafinesque's big-eared bat, Plecotus rafinesquii
Townsend's big-eared bat, Plecotus townsendii
Evening bat, Nycticeius humeralis
Seminole bat, Lasiurus seminolus
Eastern red bat, Lasiurus borealis
Silver-haired bat, Lasionycteris noctivagans
Yuma myotis, Myotis yumanensis
Cave myotis, Myotis velifer
Indiana myotis, Myotis sodalis
Little brown bat, Myotis lucifugus
Small-footed myotis, Myotis leibii
Northern myotis, Myotis keenii
Gray bat, Myotis grisescens
Southeastern myotis, Myotis austroriparius
Big brown bat, Eptesicus fuscus
Spotted bat, Euderma maculatum
Eastern red bat, Lasiurus borealis
Hoary bat, Lasiurus cinereus
Western pipistrelle, Parastrellus hesperus
Eastern pipistrelle, Pipistrellus subflavus
Townsend's big-eared bat, Corynorhinus townsendii

Free-tailed bats
Order: ChiropteraFamily: Molossidae
Western mastiff bat, Eumops perotis vagrant
Big free-tailed bat, Nyctinomops macrotis
Mexican free-tailed bat, Tadarida brasiliensis

Carnivora

Cats
Order: CarnivoraFamily: Felidae
Bobcat, Lynx rufus
Cougar, Puma concolor extirpated, vagrant

Canids
Order: CarnivoraFamily: Canidae

Coyote, Canis latrans
Gray wolf, Canis lupus extirpated
Great Plains wolf, C. l. nubilus 
Red wolf, Canis rufus extirpated
Gray fox, Urocyon cinereoargenteus
Swift fox, Vulpes velox
Red fox, Vulpes vulpes

Bears
Order: CarnivoraFamily: Ursidae

American black bear, Ursus americanus
Brown bear, Ursus arctos extirpated
Grizzly bear, U. a. horribilis extirpated

Skunks
Order: CarnivoraFamily: Mephitidae

Striped skunk, Mephitis mephitis
Western spotted skunk, Spilogale gracilis
Eastern spotted skunk, Spilogale putorius

Weasels
Order: CarnivoraFamily: Mustelidae

North American river otter, Lontra canadensis
Least weasel, Mustela nivalis
Black-footed ferret, Mustela nigripes extirpated
Long-tailed weasel, Neogale frenata
American mink, Neogale vison
American badger, Taxidea taxus

Procyonids
Order: CarnivoraFamily: Procyonidae

Ringtail, Bassariscus astutus
Raccoon, Procyon lotor

Artiodactyla

Pronghorns
Order: ArtiodactylaFamily: Antilocapridae

Pronghorn, Antilocapra americana

Bovids
Order: ArtiodactylaFamily: Bovidae

American bison, Bison bison reintroduced
Plains bison, B. b. bison reintroduced
Bighorn sheep, Ovis canadensis

Deer
Order: ArtiodactylaFamily: Cervidae

Elk, Cervus canadensis 
Mule deer, Odocoileus hemionus
White-tailed deer, Odocoileus virginianus

Pigs
Order: ArtiodactylaFamily: Suidae

Wild boar, Sus scrofa introduced

Peccaries
Order: ArtiodactylaFamily: Tayassuidae

Collared peccary, Dicotyles tajacu

See also
List of chordate orders
List of regional mammals lists

References

Oklahoma
Mammals